Hadza may refer to:

Hadza people, or Hadzabe, a hunter-gatherer people of Tanzania
Hadza language, the isolate language spoken by the Hadza people

Language and nationality disambiguation pages